Oberhofer is a band from Brooklyn, New York City, formed in 2008 to perform the music of its founder and frontman Brad Oberhofer. Current members are Brad Oberhofer on synths, guitar and vocals, Zoe Brecher on drums, Dylan Treleven on bass, and Ben Roth on guitar.

In July 2011, Brad Oberhofer signed with Glassnote Records, which released Oberhofer's debut album Time Capsules II on March 27, 2012, an EP entitled, "Notalgia" (2013), and their second album, "Chronovision" (2016) in the United States and worldwide.

History
Oberhofer started in 2008 as the recording project of Brad Oberhofer. After moving from his native Tacoma, Washington to New York City, Oberhofer attended New York University to study music composition. After using several different names, the young singer adopted his own name as the title of the project. Although the band has since gone through various lineup formations, the name has remained the same because Oberhofer writes all the music himself.

In 2010, Oberhofer self-released his first single o0Oo0O0o and was soon asked to go on tour with bands like Sleigh Bells, Neon Indian, and Matt and Kim. After hitting the road for a year, Oberhofer released Away Frm U (sic) and I Could Go in 2011. The two singles brought the attention of independent label White Iris Records who released the band's next single Gotta Go/Mahwun in the summer of 2011. Soon after, Oberhofer signed with Glassnote Records to release their debut album. Stereogum ranked the band as the No. 39 most anticipated album of 2012.

Brad began work on Time Capsules II in the studio with Grammy Award winning producer Steve Lillywhite in November 2011, recording vocals and most instrumental tracks himself, and pulling in bandmates and other instrumentalists to complete certain tracks. Glassnote released Time Capsules II on in the United States on March 27, 2012. In anticipation for the release, the band performed "Away Frm U" on the Late Show with David Letterman.

Oberhofer performed widely in clubs and on the festival circuit in support of Time Capsules II. Recent notable performances include in the Mojave Tent at the 2012 edition of the Coachella Valley Music and Arts Festival. and the Budweiser stage at Lollapalooza in Chicago on August 5, 2012. They performed at the Austin City Limits Music Festival on October 13, 2013.

Their song "I Could Go" was included as a sound track of the free ride biking movie "Where The Trail Ends" sponsored by brands such as Specialized Bicycle Components, Red Bull and others. Many of their other songs have been licensed to Television programs, Advertisements, and online series, including, Catfish: The TV Show, Skins, LUV, T-Mobile, SoBe, BoJack Horseman, Kevin from Work, Underemployed, Teen Wolf, Table 19.

Their song "Gold" also was included as a sound track of the soccer simulation game by Konami, Pro Evolution Soccer 2013. In 2016, their song "Sea of Dreams" from Chronovision was prominently featured in the fourth episode of season 3 of Netflix's animated TV series BoJack Horseman, "Fish Out of Water", which was voted Time Magazine's Best episode of television in 2016.

Discography

Albums
Time Capsules II (Glassnote Records, 2012)
Chronovision (Glassnote Records, 2015)
Table 19 (Motion Picture Soundtrack): Oberhofer's Ultimate Wedding Mixtape (Glassnote Records, 2017)
Smothered (Telefono, 2021)
The Andy Warhol Diaries OST (NETFLIX, 2022)

EPs
Notalgia EP (Glassnote Records, 2013)
o000o000o EP (Glassnote Records, 2009)

Singles

References

Indie rock musical groups from New York (state)
Musical groups from Brooklyn
Musical groups established in 2008
Glassnote Records artists